Valkhof Festival is a free annual music festival in Nijmegen, Netherlands.

The festival takes place in mid-July as part of the Vierdaagsefeesten, the festivities accompanying the International Four Days Marches Nijmegen. It focuses mainly on all varieties of alternative, indie and progressive music. It is organized by the Dutch venues Doornroosje, Merleyn, Extrapool and Pan. The performances are on several locations in the city, mainly in parc Valkhof in the centre of the city next to the Waal. The castle on the location gives an overview over the river.

Line-up 2012
Bombino, Breton, Hanni El Khatib, Hjalmar, Honningbarna, The Jezabels, Mozes and the Firstborn, Palio Superspeed Donkey, Red Fang, St. Lucia, Twin Shadow, Ufomammut, Zola Jesus, Ewert and the Two Dragons, François & the Atlas Mountains, Getatchew Mekuria & The Ex, Bismuth, Jagwar Ma, Kurt Vile and the Violators, Orchestra of Spheres, Rats on Rafts

Line-up 2011
Pioneers of Love, Jamie Woon, Aucan, Blues Brother Castro, Charlie Jones Big Band, Mike Denhert, Houses, The Ocean, Pop Up Animal Kids, Retro Stefson, Roy Santiago, The Severed Limb, Shaking Godspeed, Benton, Dagoba, Eefje de Visser, Graveyard, MDC, Obeah, Ólafur Arnalds, Radio Moscow, Steak Number Eight, San Soda, Spokes, Traumahelikopter, Vanderbuyst, Keko Yoma

Line-up 2010
The Sore Losers, DeWolff, And So I Watch You From Afar, Errors, Los Campesinos!, The Antlers, Darwin Deez, These Are Powers, Shearwater, Dungen, Holly Miranda, Post War Years, Mayer Hawthorne & The County, Sarah Blasko, Beans & Fatback, The Crookes, Daily Bread, Woost, Health

Line-up 2009
Sleepy Sun, Caribou, The Dodos, The Wooden Constructions, Blood Red Shoes, Deerhoof, Nisennenmondai

Line-up 2008 
The Accidental  •  Anavarin  •  DJ Baco Pirelli  •  Beansprouts  •  Believeisadoubt  •  Big Grin  •  Bjorn Engelen  •  Black Bottle Riot  •  Black Box Revelation  •  The Black Seeds  •  Blaudzun  •  Boelens, Windemuller, Flubacher, Pourier  •  Bonne Aparte  •  Boolean  •  Brat Pack  •  Canceled: The Juan Maclean  •  Capacocha  •  Charly Zastrau Trio  •  Chrome Hoof  •  The Cohens  •  De Kwelling van Pythagoras  •  De Staat  •  Dead Man Running  •  DeVotchka  •  Donné et Desirée  •  Dunne Norm Dikke Waard  •  Eats Tapes  •  DJ Eli Groen  •  Estudiantina Ensemble  •  Fink  •  Finntroll  •  Francisco Lopez & Richard Francis  •  Freaky Age  •  Fuhler/De Joode/Bennink/Moore  •  Fyoelk  •  Get Well Soon  •  Grand Wazoo  •  Heidevolk  •  Helter Skelter feat. DJ St. Paul  •  The Hot Stewards  •  Intero  •  Invasives  •  Jacky Heretic  •  James Pants  •  Jean Parlette  •  Jip Deluxe + Max Moral + Nicky Romero  •  John & Jehn  •  DJ Kabaal & Sjans  •  Kaywon High School of Arts Orchestra  •  Kraft Derrick feat. Otto Orgel  •  Krause  •  Late of the Pier  •  Le Club des Chats  •  Lea  •  Leine  •  Liars  •  Lucky Fonz III  •  Lynn  •  Maravilla de Florida  •  Marten de Paepe  •  Mini roc  •  Miracle Fortress  •  MoHa!  •  Mugison  •  Myrkvar  •  NatureBoy  •  Neurobit  •  New Killer Stars  •  Nueva Manteca  •  Okieson  •  The Pedro Delgados  •  Phonc & Stout!  •  Phosphorescent  •  Pivot  •  SAT2D  •  N.E.W feat: Sennh + dB + Da Boetie Sjeeka + Chaosmaker + Jan Liefhebber  •  SixNationState  •  DJ Slowpoke  •  Smash the Statues  •  Solomun (D) + Pitto + Pure  •  Stone Drone  •  The Subs  •  The Teenagers  •  Tin Wish Tin  •  Triggerfinger  •  Tyrants Of The Ancient Law  •  Valentin vs Mark Buning  •  Voer  •  Wax 'n' Wane  •  Why?  •  Yacht  •  Yordan Orchestra  •

Line-up 2007 
A Hawk and A Hacksaw • Animal Collective • Anneke van Giersbergen • Another Mesiah • Au Revoir Simone • Azucar Negra • Balkan Beats feat. DJ's Grandes Lupres & Tomasc • Battlelore • Bite the Gnatze • Bonde do Role • Bratpack • Breaktrack • Brown vs brown • C-Mon & Kypski • Coalition of the Wicked • Danbert Nobacon • Das Pop • De Balie • De Staat • Deflux 'finest drum'n bass' • Denvis & The Real Deal • DJ @-CHILL-e • DJ Alain Fener • DJ Eli • DJ Joey • DJ Johnny Smoke • DJ Jorg & friends • DJ Kult:X • DJ Nina • DJ Passé • DJ Slowpoke • DJ Spindizzy • DJ Valentin • dj Yuchi • djset • DjYuchi & Dj Rayita • Do the Undo • Enge Buren • Erase Errata • Fear My Thoughts • Fixkes • Gatecrash • General Electric Paradise • Gitbox! • Harald Sack Ziegler • Herman Dune • Ignaz Schick • It Takes Two • Kania Tiefer • Knuspi Brothers Pasfotoservice • Konono Nº1 • Kraków • La Troba Kung Fu • Leafcutter John • Machinefabriek & Robert Deeters • Mardi Gras.BB • Maskesmachine • Meindert Talma & The Negroes • Memphis Maniacs • Merry Pierce • Monsieur Dubois • Mr. Blue Sky • 'n Momentje rust met een dichter • N.E.W.: Captain Hell & The Sweet Monicas, Darko Esser, dB, DJ Pure, Jorg, LEM • Nadara Gypsy Wedding Band • Narcissus Quartet • NE1 • Nirika • No Means No • Osmosis • Phantom Puercos • Planet Rose feat. Donato Dozzy, Giorgos Gatzigristos, Monokreck • Puts Marie • Rinus Groenveld / Jan Reinen kwartet • Roy Santiago • Sennen • Shy Child • Signe Tollefsen • Skip Intro • SoKo • Sonora Universal • St.Paul • Stijn • Stille disco • Super Sonic Megafuckers • Sven Ratzke • T99 • Ten Horned Devels • Textures • The Audience • The Barons Remedy • The Bees • The Biarritz Boys • The Cosmic Brothers • The Drones • The Girls • The Jai-Alai Savant • The Kevin Costners • The Kleber Claux Memorial Singers • The May Bees • The Presets • The Rapture • The Robocop Kraus • The Soul Snatchers • The Tellers • The Upsessions • To My Boy (GB) • Two Gallants • Victimizer • Willie Duursma • Z'EV • Zita Swoon

Line-up 2006 
El Pino & the Volunteers • the Chap • Cafebar 401 • DansGarantie • Mistura Fina • Coolhaven • Nighthawks at the Diner ft Maud • Headman • Pep Ventura • Archie Bronson Outfit • Seanpenn • Backwater • Dubius • Wheel • Transworld • Lea • the Bloody Honkies • Shiver • Leaf • With ice • Silence is sexy • Troy von Balthazar • Puppetmastaz • Sneakerfreak • Van het concert des levens... een avond van het Levenslied • Zèbra • Sonora Universal • Bauchklang • Dijf Sanders • Aavikko • Stille disco • Duchess Says • Islands White Cowbell Oklahoma • DJ Hein O))) • Final Fantasy • Loco Loco Discoshow • Bell Orchestre • We Are Wolves • Jetsams • Stille disco • Moss • Battles • Blues Brother Castro • Pien Feith • Les Fils de Teuphu Yuri Honing Wired Paradise • Slowpoke Rodrigo • Heavy Trash feat Jon Spencer & Matt Verta-Ray • Jawat & Dj Nemom & Kubus • Sobchek feat Slemper • the Thermals • About • Kornreiniger • the Toasters • Jan Reinen Trio • Knifehandchop • Stille disco • Planet Rose met Petter • Le Clic • LL • & Piet van Dongen • the Feromones • Buck 65 • Gasoline Brothers • Margriet kicks-ass • Antwerp Gipsy Ska Orchestra • Bo's da Bomb 2 • Hospital Bombers • N-E-W Nijmeegsche Electronische Waar • We vs Death • Hacienda Brothers • Antillectual • Madame P • Amigos do Sol • Domingo Siete • Tom Beek Kwartet • Disco Ensemble • Kraak & Smaak Dj-set • Butt Fuck Pussy • Oostfront • Tifen • Inna Truth & the people of... • Sven Ratzke • Tuig • Different Trains • De Vuurwagen • Circus in de War

Line-up 2005 

13 & god (The Notwist vs. Themselves) • Ajiaco • Alex Smoke (UK) • Amina Figarova trio • Bahía Blanca • Bananen van de Buren • Bart Tarenskeen quartet • Benny Sings • Bong Ra • Break Dance • Dandymite & the Fanatics • Danspodium • David Gilmour Girls + DJ Femke • Dj Mark • DJ Tin Wish Twin • Electrocute (D) • Eli • Furtips • Gone Bald • High Tone (F) • Hulk • I Compani met Bo van de Graaf • illusions factory • Impro Vi • Jazzoulle • Jesse • Johnny Smoke vs. Dre • J-Stars • Junior Boys (CAN) • Kompaktrekorder • Kunstbende • La Kinky Beat (ES) • la Noche del Lunatismo • Les Georges Leningrad (Can) • Loco Loco Roadshow • Lomechanik (Toktek, Apzolut,Jorg) • LPG • Maikel Thijssen kwartet • Martin Luther (of The Roots, USA) • Mens & Blonk  • Monsoon • Multidisciplinair performance • Nieuw Gelders Peil • Oso El Roto, Manuel J Grotesque, TG (FR)  • Out of many • Pole Fitness • Prijsuitreiking kunstbende • Robin Verheyen quartet (B/NL) • Roosbeef • Salt • Scotty! • Scout Niblett (UK) • Sharon Jones & the Dapkings (USA) • Skip the Rush • Slim Jim Phantom Trio (USA) • Slowpoke • Smutfish • Spider Rico • Spookshow • Stöma • Stephan-Max Wirth kwartet • Stille Disco • Strange attractor/Sonar lodge • Sven Ratzke • Tango Trio • Telder speelt Blauwbaard • The Bips • The Boss Hoss (D) • The Bottle rockets (USA) • The Pax • The Suicidal Birds (Fr) • Think of One (B) speelt Chuva Em Poí • Tuk (B) [Barbarossaruïne] • UM (UK) [Barbarossaruïne] • Un regalo por ti • Wawadadakwa (B ) • We Insist • Woost • Yes R / Jeugd van Tegenwoordig

External links
 De Affaire

Music festivals in the Netherlands
Tourist attractions in Gelderland
Music in Nijmegen